The La Normal railway station is part of the Guadalajara light rail system in the Mexican state of Jalisco. The station serves the area surrounding the Glorieta La Normal, a roundabout in the city.

Guadalajara light rail system Line 3 stations
Railway stations in Guadalajara
Railway stations opened in 2020
Railway stations located underground in Mexico